The Philadelphia Ballers were a basketball team based in Philadelphia, Pennsylvania. The team competed in the Junior Basketball Association (JBA), a league created for high school and junior college players as an alternative to the National Collegiate Athletic Association (NCAA).

History 
The JBA was first announced on December 20, 2017, when media personality LaVar Ball said to Slam magazine that he would create a professional league targeted at high school graduates and fully funded by his sports apparel company Big Baller Brand. In the tryouts, LaVar found a full roster for the team, thus being the only team to do so for the entire (inaugural) season. However, they ended their inaugural season with the worst regular season, winning only one game that year (against the Seattle Ballers) on July 5, 2018.

Final roster

References

External links 
JBA official website

Junior Basketball Association teams
Basketball teams in Philadelphia
Basketball teams in the United States
Basketball teams established in 2018